Ageratum littorale, the Cape Sable whiteweed, is a plant species native to Florida, the common name referring to Cape Sable inside Everglades National Park. Some publications (e. g. Flora of North America) consider this as being the same species as the West Indian A. maritimum, but The Plant List accepts the two as distinct taxa. It is their lead that we are following here.

Stems are glabrous except at the nodes. Flowers are blue, lavender or white, in cyme-like arrays.

References

littorale
Flora of Florida
Plants described in 1880